Roberto Ramos (born 6 August 1959) is a Cuban former sprinter.

References

1959 births
Living people
Cuban male sprinters
Universiade medalists in athletics (track and field)
Place of birth missing (living people)
Central American and Caribbean Games gold medalists for Cuba
Competitors at the 1982 Central American and Caribbean Games
Universiade gold medalists for Cuba
Central American and Caribbean Games medalists in athletics
Friendship Games medalists in athletics
20th-century Cuban people